Henri Martin de La Bastide d'Hust (14 December 1916 – 23 May 1986) was a French writer and scholar. He studied at the Institut national des langues et civilisations orientales, of which he was director from 1976 until 1986.

He was a member of the Club de l'horloge.

References

External links 
 Henri de La Bastide on data.bnf.fr

Carrefour de l'horloge people
20th-century French non-fiction writers
1916 births
1986 deaths